1. Fußballclub Union Berlin e. V., commonly known as 1. FC Union Berlin or Union Berlin, is a professional German football club in Köpenick, Berlin.

The club's origins can be traced to 1906, when its predecessor FC Olympia Oberschöneweide was founded. During the Cold War, Union was based in East Berlin, joining the German league structure upon the reunification of the city and country in 1990. From 2009 until 2019, they competed in the 2. Bundesliga, the second tier of German football. In 2019, Union won promotion to the Bundesliga for the first time in the club's history. In 2022, the club qualified for the UEFA Europa League. 

The home ground of the club is the Stadion An der Alten Försterei. It is the second-largest in the German capital and has been home to Union Berlin and its forerunners since it opened in 1920. The stadium also hosts concerts and the annual Weihnachtssingen Christmas carols event.

As of 2022, Union Berlin has 45,000 official members.     The club has become well known for its enthusiastic and creative fan base and its chant "Eisern Union" (Iron Union).

History

First foundation (1906–1945)
The name 1. FC Union Berlin was used by two football clubs that shared a common origin as FC Olympia Oberschöneweide, founded in 1906 in Oberschöneweide, which at that time was a suburb of Berlin. The side took on the name SC Union 06 Oberschöneweide in 1910. Union was one of Berlin's premier clubs in the interwar period, regularly winning local championships and competing at the national level, including an appearance in the 1923 German championship final which they lost 0–3 to Hamburger SV.

Early on, the team was nicknamed "Schlosserjungs" (English: metalworker-boys) because of their then all blue kit, reminiscent of the typical work clothing worn in the factories of the industrial Oberschöneweide district. The popular cry of Union supporters – "Eisern Union!" (Iron Union) – also emerged at this time. Since its foundation the club has had a distinct working-class image, in contrast to other local clubs with more middle-class origins, such as Viktoria 89 Berlin, Blau-Weiß 90 Berlin, BSV 92 Berlin or Tennis Borussia Berlin.

In 1933, German football was reorganized under the Third Reich into 16 top-flight divisions known as Gauligen. Oberschöneweide became part of the Gauliga Berlin-Brandenburg, where they generally earned middling, unexceptional results. They were relegated in 1935 and returned to first division play in 1936 after only one season's absence. In 1940, the team finished first in Group B of the division and then defeated Blau-Weiß 90 (1–2, 3–0) to win the overall division title. That advanced the club to the national playoffs where they were put out by Rapid Wien in the opening group round (2–3, 1–3). Union resumed its place as an unremarkable side. They were relegated again in 1942 and played the final war-shortened Gauliga season in 1944–45.

Dissolution and split (1945–1961)

After World War II, occupying Allied authorities ordered the dissolution of all organizations in Germany, including sports and football associations. A new sport community called SG Oberschöneweide was formed in late 1945 and it played in the City League organized immediately after the war which had four regional departments. The team did not qualify to the newly created Oberliga Berlin (I) in 1946 after a poor season, but was promoted in 1947, won the division title right away and regained club status as SG Union Oberschöneweide during 1948–49.

The club finished the 1949–50 season in second place in Berlin and qualified to take part in the national final rounds. However, escalating Cold War tensions led Soviet authorities to refuse the team permission to travel to take part. Two Union teams then emerged as most players and coaches fled to the west to form Sport-Club Union 06 Berlin which took part in the scheduled playoff match in Kiel against Hamburger SV, losing 0–7.

The players remaining in the east carried on as SG Union Oberschöneweide while a number of players who had fled to the west to form SC organized a third side called Berliner Ballspiel-Club Südost. The western team was a strong side until the construction of the Berlin Wall in 1961, drawing huge crowds to matches in the Olympiastadion. The division of the city led to a change of fortunes for BBC Südost which plays today in the lower divisions before meagre crowds.

Restart as Union Berlin (1961–1990)

The eastern branch of the club went through a number of name changes: Union Oberschöneweide (1950), BSG Motor Oberschöneweide (1951), SC Motor Berlin (1955), TSC Oberschöneweide (1957), TSC Berlin (1963) – finally becoming the football club 1. FC Union Berlin in 1966.

1. FC Union Berlin was founded during the reorganization of East German football in December 1965 and January 1966, when ten dedicated football clubs were created. However, the football department of TSC Berlin was originally not taken into account. Only two clubs were planned for East Berlin, to be formed from the football departments of ASK Vorwärts Berlin and SC Dynamo Berlin. This was already contrary to the original plan, which had envisioned only one football club per district. And the football department of TSC Berlin was only playing in the second tier DDR-Liga at the time.

1. FC Union Berlin was allegedly founded on the initiative of the powerful Herbert Warnke. Herbert Warnke was the chairman of the state-controlled national trade union FDGB and a member of the SED Politburo. Another SED politician who pushed for the founding of 1. FC Union Berlin was the SED First Secretary in East Berlin Paul Verner. Like Warnke, Verner was also a Politburo member. Both ASK Vorwärts Berlin and SC Dynamo Berlin were associated with the armed organs. Warnke therefore argued for the creation of a third "civilian club" for the working people in East Berlin. He would become a passionate fan of 1. FC Union Berlin and a sponsoring member of the club. 

1. FC Union Berlin was established in the middle of one of the largest industrial centers in East Germany. 1. FC Union Berlin was initially supported by the FDGB. The intention of the SED to win the support from FDGB for 1. FC Union Berlin was likely well thought out. The FDGB unified all workers in East Germany and therefore was most likely to carry the proper identity for a club of the working people. The club was founded in a ceremony in the clubhouse of VEB Transformatorenwerk Oberschöneheide "Karl Liebknecht" (TRO) in Oberschöneweide on 20 January 1966. The founding of the club was organized by the then-SED First Secretary in Köpenick, Hans Modrow. Like Herbert Warnke, Hans Modrow would be a sponsoring member of the club. SED Politburo member Paul Verner held a speech at the inaugural meeting.

1. FC Union Berlin was the only football club not playing in the DDR-Oberliga at the time of its founding. As a dedicated football club, it was elevated into the upper tier of privileged elite clubs. The first club president was the general director of VVB Hochspannungsgeräte und Kabel, Werner Otto, and his deputy was the SED Second Secretary in East Berlin, Hans Wagner. Even as a "civilian club", 1. FC Union Berlin was part of the  state sports political system. 1. FC Union Berlin was state-funded and all club decisions had to be reported to the all-powerful central sports agency DTSB. In turn, the DTSB stood under direct control of the SED Central Committee. The official sponsor of 1. FC Union Berlin was the state-owned combine VVB Hochspannungsgeräte und Kabel, which implemented its support through VEB Kabelwerk Oberspree, VEB Transformatorenwerk Oberschöneweide and other local state-owned enterprises.  

The support from the FDGB ended when Herbert Warnke was replaced by Harry Tisch as the chairman of the FDGB in 1975. Tisch had begun his political career in Rostock and instead gave his support to FC Hansa Rostock. This event was remarkable, as it revealed the large influence that high-ranking politicians exerted on football in East Germany. 1. FC Union Berlin would then had to rely on support from the regional district administration of the ruling SED party in East Berlin and local state-owned enterprises. The main sponsors would be VEB Kabelwerk Oberspree (KWO), VEB Transformatorenwerk Oberschöneweide (TRO) and VEB Werk für Fernsehelektronik (WF). 1. FC Union Berlin developed a bitter rivalry with BFC Dynamo, which was supported by the Stasi. While their arch rivals won 10 titles in a row, Union yo-yoed between the DDR-Oberliga and the DDR-Liga with very little success. Union managed to win the East German Cup in 1968 when they defeated FC Carl Zeiss Jena 2–1 although they lost in their second cup appearance in 1986 to 1. FC Lokomotive Leipzig by a score of 1–5.

The East German state-owned film studio DEFA produced a documentary about the supporters of 1. FC Union Berlin in 1989. The documentary is called "And Fridays at the Green Hell" and follows a group of supporters of 1. FC Union Berlin to both home and away matches during the 1987–88 season.

2. Bundesliga era (1990–2019)

After German reunification in 1990, the team continued to perform well on the field, but almost collapsed financially. They managed to hang on through some tight times and find sponsorship, but only after winning their division in both 1993 and 1994 and each time being denied a license to play in the 2. Bundesliga due to their financial problems. The club had another close brush with financial failure in 1997.

Union again came close to advancing to the 2. Bundesliga in 1998–99 and 1999–2000, but were disappointed. They were finally successful in 2000–01, under Bulgarian manager Georgi Vasilev, easily winning the Regionalliga Nord (III) and moving up a division to become the city's second most popular side. That same year they appeared in the final of the German Cup where they lost 0–2 to FC Schalke 04, and advanced as far as the second round in UEFA Cup before being put out by Bulgarian side PFC Litex Lovech. The club slipped to the Regionalliga Nord (III) in 2004–05 and then to the NOFV-Oberliga Nord (IV) in 2005–06, but returned to third division play after capturing the Oberliga title. In 2008–09, Union became one of the founding clubs of the new 3. Liga, and its inaugural champion, securing first place and promotion to the 2. Bundesliga on 10 May.

A controversy erupted in 2011 when it became publicly known that club president Dirk Zingler had been a member of the Felix Dzerzhinsky Guards Regiment for three years during his military service. Only two years before, Zingler had cancelled a sponsorship deal with the company International Sport Promotion (ISP) because the head of the board at the company had been a Stasi officer. The Felix Dzerzhinsky Guards Regiment was the paramilitary wing of the Stasi. Zingler explained that he had sought to spend his military service in Berlin and that he was unaware beforehand that the regiment belonged to the Stasi. However, the Felix Dzerzhinsky Guards Regiment was an elite formation; it was not possible to simply apply for the regiment. The Stasi selected who it thought were best fit to serve with the regiment, only accepting recruits that were "loyal to the line".

The team remained in the second tier until the 2018–19 season, when they secured their first-ever promotion into the Bundesliga after defeating VfB Stuttgart in the relegation play-offs. The fans invaded the pitch after the victory, but no one was harmed.

Bundesliga era (2019–present)
Union Berlin became the first Bundesliga club from the former East Berlin and the sixth from the former East Germany, after Dynamo Dresden, Hansa Rostock, VfB Leipzig, Energie Cottbus, and RB Leipzig. The team is the sixth to win promotion from the 2. Bundesliga by beating the 16th-placed Bundesliga team in the playoff – since it began in the 1981–82 season, the others being Bayer Uerdingen, 1. FC Saarbrücken, Stuttgarter Kickers, 1. FC Nürnberg and Fortuna Düsseldorf. Ahead of Union Berlin's debut season in the Bundesliga, the club signed Neven Subotić, Anthony Ujah and Christian Gentner, as well as re-signing Marvin Friedrich, who had scored a decisive goal against Stuttgart in the play-offs in the previous season to secure promotion for the club. The first ever Bundesliga goal was scored by Sebastian Andersson in a 1–1 draw against Augsburg. On 31 August 2019, the club claimed its first ever Bundesliga victory by beating Borussia Dortmund 3–1 in a home game. The team finished the season in 11th place, with Sebastian Andersson scoring 12 goals.

On 22 May 2021, in Union Berlin's second Bundesliga season, the club qualified for the inaugural UEFA Europa Conference League after finishing seventh, following a 2–1 home win against RB Leipzig, with Max Kruse confirming Union Berlin's first European campaign in twenty years, with a 92nd-minute winner.

Stadium

In 1920 SC Union Oberschöneweide (forerunner of today's 1. FC Union Berlin) had to find a new home ground as its former pitch had been built over by developers with residential buildings. The club moved a little further away from the city to the north-western part of the borough of Köpenick. The new stadium was officially opened in August 1920 with a match between Oberschöneweide and the then German champions 1. FC Nürnberg (1–2). The inaugural match in at the Alte Försterei had already been played on 17 March, when Union challenged Viktoria 89 Berlin.

When Union won promotion to the DDR-Oberliga (the top flight in East Germany) in 1966, the stadium soon needed to be expanded. The ground was first expanded in 1970 when the Gegengerade terrace was raised, whilst further extensions to the terracing at both ends in the late 1970s and early 1980s increased the capacity furthermore to 22,500. However, the somewhat spartan facilities at Alte Försterei had quickly begun to show their age and went into a serious decline.

After German reunification, when Union were assigned by the German Football Association to play in the third league, the outdated stadium proved only one of a number of factors that hampered the club's push for promotion to higher leagues.

In the middle of 2008, the club decided to finally modernise the stadium, the Stadion An der Alten Försterei (Old Forester's House). Money was still tight, and so the fans simply built the ground themselves. More than 2,000 Union supporters invested 140,000 working hours to create what is now regarded as the largest football-specific stadium in Berlin. During the redevelopment, Union played at the Friedrich-Ludwig-Jahn-Sportpark. Inside the stadium an array of outside beer kiosks and open air grills serving bratwurst and pork steaks at the back of the stand provide the culinary staples. The official opening on 12 July 2013, was celebrated with a friendly against Scottish Champions Celtic. It holds 22,012 people with 3,617 seats. The rest is terracing.

World Cup living room
In 2014, the club came up with the idea of inviting their fans to take their own sofas to the ground for the whole of the World Cup, to enjoy the televised matches in the company of fellow supporters. More than 800 sofas were placed on the pitch in rows in front of a big screen. The event was later recognized with the Fan Experience Award at The Stadium Business Summit 2015 in Barcelona.

Organization

1. FC Union Berlin is led mostly by fans. Dirk Zingler has served as the club's president since 2004. The club had 41,088 registered members in 2022.

Sport Management 
 Oliver Ruhnert since 5 May 2018

Sponsorships
1. FC Union Berlin is sponsored by around 300 private and corporate partners.

Organizational history 
The organizational history of 1. FC Union Berlin includes several different clubs and names.

Players

Current squad

Out on loan

Notable former players

 Jörg Heinrich
 Robert Huth
 Torsten Mattuschka
 Marko Rehmer
 Karim Benyamina
 Sergej Barbarez
 Daniel Teixeira
 Patrick Kohlmann
 Bobby Wood
 Max Kruse
 Taiwo Awoniyi

All-time top scorer
 Karim Benyamina (87)

The number 22 will not be worn on the back of a Union shirt until someone breaks the all-time Union scoring record of Karim Benyamina, who scored 87 goals in 213 appearances for the club. "This is a great gesture by president Dirk Zingler. That is the reward for six successful years," he said in 2016. Over 14,000 fans turned out to give Benyamina his career send-off alongside another legend, Torsten Mattuschka, who is often seen as the face of that particular era for Union.

Reserve team
The club's reserve team, 1. FC Union Berlin II, most recently played in the tier four Regionalliga Nordost, having won promotion to the league in 2012. Previous to this it spent two seasons in the NOFV-Oberliga Nord. At the end of the 2014–15 season the club withdrew the team from competition.

Women
Union Berlin's women's team was formed in September 1969, becoming the first women's team in Berlin and one of the first in East Germany. The women's team initially competed against Union Berlin's youth teams due to a lack of opponents, playing their first game on 17 January 1970, losing 7–1. In 1971, the team were amalgamated into KWO Berlin's women's team, before KWO merged with Union Berlin in June 1990 following German reunification. The team currently compete in the Regionalliga Nordost.

Coaching staff

Managerial history

European record

Overview

Matches
Union Berlin score listed first.

Player records

Most appearances 
Competitive, professional matches only.
Up to date as of 24 January 2023

Top goalscorers 
Competitive, professional matches only.
Up to date as of 24 January 2023

Club culture

1. FC Union Berlin is recognized as one of Europe's "cult" clubs, based on many unique fan and club initiatives over the last two decades.

The nicknames of the club are Eiserne (the Iron Ones) or Eisern Union (Iron Union). These nicknames evolved from the earlier sobriquet Schlosserjungs (metalworker boys), a reference to the blue kit the Union played in, as it was reminiscent of the overalls worn by local workers.

In May 2004, the supporters raised enough money to secure the club's license for fourth-division football through a campaign called 'Bleed for Union'. This catchphrase was not meant metaphorically. One element of the campaign was that fans donated blood to Berlin hospitals and then gave the money they received from the blood bank to their club.

After 2010, Union Berlin became increasingly attractive for new Berliners, even internationals, who were drawn to the atmosphere at the club.

Rivalries

During the East German era, 1. FC Union Berlin was known for a rivalry with BFC Dynamo, which was reputedly affiliated with the powerful state security service of East Germany (Stasi). Union was supported by the regional district administration of the governing SED party and sponsored by local state-owned enterprises. The club played some identificatory role in the unofficial opposition against the authorities of the communist system. Between 1979 and 1988, BFC Dynamo won ten consecutive East German league titles, with popular allegations of sporting misconduct helping to fuel the rivalry, and clashes between both sets of fans occurred. BFC Dynamo was seen as the supreme representative of the security agencies, with advantages in the recruitment of players and financial support as well as the political clout of Erich Mielke. Supporters of Union cultivated the image of their club as the eternal underdog that was firmly rooted in the working class. Union became the most popular club in East Berlin.

It is said that fans of 1. FC Union Berlin often chanted "The wall must go!", with a reference to the Berlin Wall, when the opponents formed a wall during free kicks in 1980s. However, some sources suggest that this is partly a myth and exaggerated. Supporters of Union saw themselves as stubborn and non-conformist. But this image should not be confused with actual resistance. For some supporters of Union, the dissident reputation is a legend that was created after Die Wende. Honorary president of Union Günter Mielis has said: "Union was not a club of resistance fighters, but we had to fight against a lot of political and economic resistance over and over again. We got strength from our fans". Politics was not in the foreground. Most supporters of Union were just normal football supporters. There were no political groups at Union. A supporter of Union from the East German era has said: "With the best of intentions, Union fans did not contribute to the overthrow of the GDR. No way, we were interested in football. There is the cliché about the club for the enemies of the state, but that wasn't us". Supporters of Union from the East German era have testified that the club was the most important thing, and the identification with Union had primarily to do with Köpenick.

Despite 1. FC Union Berlin and Hertha BSC making up the two biggest clubs in Berlin, a rivalry between the two has been much less pronounced. Sympathies between supporters of the two clubs developed in divided Berlin. The first personal contacts between supporters of the two clubs occurred in the 1970s. Supporters of Hertha visited the Stadion An der Alten Försterei and supporters of Union accompanied the supporters of Hertha when Hertha played in the Eastern Bloc countries, such as the quarter finals in the 1978–79 UEFA Cup against Dukla Prague. Chants and slogans such as "Ha-Ho-He, there are only two teams on the Spree - Union and Hertha BSC" and "Hertha and Union - one nation" became popular among the two sets of supporters. The two sets of supporters came together for the first time after the opening of the Berlin wall during the first edition of the indoor tournament "Internationales Berliner Hallenfußballturnier" in the Werner-Seelenbinder-Halle on 18–20 January 1990. Supporters of Union and Hertha now also sang xenophobic and nationalist chants.

On 27 January 1990, 79 days after the fall of the Berlin Wall, Hertha hosted Union Berlin at the Olympiastadion in a friendly in front of 52,000 spectators. Fans of both clubs paid for admission in East and West Germany's respective currencies and sang songs of German reunification as Hertha won 2–1. Over twenty years later, on 17 September 2010, the duo faced each other for a second time, in their first competitive meeting, at the Stadion An der Alten Försterei, drawing 1–1 in the 2. Bundesliga. On 2 November 2019, Union Berlin faced Hertha at the Stadion An der Alten Försterei, in the first clash between the clubs in the top flight of German football. An 87th minute Sebastian Polter penalty secured a 1–0 win for Union, in a game temporarily suspended by referee Deniz Aytekin, following fireworks fired by Hertha fans landing amongst Union Berlin fans, as well as on the playing surface. 1,100 police officers were on duty for the game, with Hertha fans burning Union Berlin shirts, flags and scarves during the game. The supporters of Hertha had also been joined by 20-25 supporters of BFC Dynamo in the guest block. Following full time, Union Berlin goalkeeper Rafał Gikiewicz won praise from fans and media alike after ushering Union Berlin ultras from the field of play, following a minor pitch invasion devised to attack Hertha supporters.

Union Berlin also holds rivalries with Hansa Rostock, Dynamo Dresden, and Magdeburg dating back to when the teams used to compete in the DDR-Oberliga.

More recently, the club has developed a rivalry with RB Leipzig, following the takeover of license and teams from fifth division side SSV Markranstädt financed by Red Bull GmbH and the ascension by Leipzig to the Bundesliga system. In 2011, Union Berlin ran adverts against the investment of the club whilst also cancelling a pre-season friendly with the club. On 21 September 2014, Union Berlin fans staged a silent protest for the first 15 minutes of a 2. Bundesliga home game against RB Leipzig, labelling RB Leipzig a "marketing product pushed by financial interests" with "brainwashed consumers in the stands". Union Berlin won the game 2–1. On 18 August 2019, during Union Berlin's first ever Bundesliga game, at home against RB Leipzig, the club's oldest ultras group, the Wuhlesyndikat, successfully called for a 15-minute silent protest at the start of the club's 2019–20 opener.

Songs
The official Union Berlin song is "Eisern Union" by German punk singer Nina Hagen. The composition was recorded in 1998. Four versions were issued on a CD single by G.I.B Music and Distribution GmbH.

The famous supporters' chant 'Eisern Union' (Iron Union) bounces back and forth between the terraces named Waldseite and the Gegengerade, and is followed by mutual acknowledging applause.

Christmas tradition
Union Berlin is also well known for its Christmas traditions celebrated in their home stadium. In 2003 the yearly Union Weihnachtssingen started as an unofficial gathering to which just 89 fans showed up. In 2013, 27,500 people attended, including players and supporters of other teams from around Germany and Europe. Fans drink Glühwein (mulled wine), wave candles around, light flares and sing a combination of Christmas carols and football chants.

Mascot
Ritter Keule (Literally: Cudgel the Knight) is the mascot of Union Berlin. He was first introduced in 2000.

Movies and games
Union fürs Leben (Union for life) is a 2014 documentary film that showcases the supporters passion for 1. FC Union Berlin.

Honours

Domestic

 German Football Championship
 Runners-up: 1923
 DDR-Liga Nord (II)
 Winners: 1965–66, 1969–70
 Runners-up: 1963–64
 DDR-Liga B (II)
 Winners: 1973–74, 1974–75, 1975–76, 1980–81, 1981–82 
 DDR-Liga A (II)
 Winners: 1984–85, 1990–91
 Runners-up: 1989–90
 II. DDR-Liga I (III)
 Winners: 1961–62
 3. Liga (III)
 Winners: 2008–09
 DFB-Pokal
 Runners-up: 2000–01
 FDGB-Pokal:
 Winners: 1967–68
 Runners-up: 1985–86

Regional
 Berlin/Brandenburg Champions (−1933)
 Winners: 1920, 1923
 Runners-up: 1917, 1925
 Gauliga Berlin-Brandenburg:
 Winners: 1940
 Oberliga Berlin (1945–63):
 Winners: 1947–48
 Runners-up: 1949–50
 NOFV-Oberliga Mitte (III)
 Winners: 1991–92, 1992–93, 1993–94
 Regionalliga Nordost (III)
 Winners: 1995–96, 1999–2000
 Regionalliga Nord (III)
 Winners: 2000–01
 NOFV-Oberliga Nord (IV)
 Winner: 2005–06
 Berlin Cup (Tiers III-VII)
 Winners: 1947, 1948, 1994, 2007, 2009
 Runners-up: 1926, 1997

Youth
East German Youth Championship (de)
 Runners-up: 1985, 1988
East German Junior Cup (Junge Welt-Pokal) (de)
Winners: 1960

Seasons

Further reading
 Böttcher, Jan; Willmann, Frank. (2017). Alles auf Rot: Der 1. FC Union Berlin (in German), Berlin: Blumenbar. .
 Koch, Matthias. (2013). "Immer weiter – ganz nach vorn": Die Geschichte des 1. FC Union Berlin (in German). Göttingen: Die Werkstatt. .
 Luther, Jörn; Willmann, Frank. (2001). Und niemals vergessen – Eisern Union! (in German). Berlin: BasisDruck. .

See also
Football in Germany
Football in Berlin
Sport in Berlin

Explanatory notes

References

External links

Documentary "Friday's at the 'Green Hell'" (1989) at the Federal Agency for Civic Education 

1. FC Union Berlin
Football clubs in Germany
Football clubs in East Germany
Union 1. FC
Association football clubs established in 1966
1966 establishments in East Germany
Bundesliga clubs
2. Bundesliga clubs
3. Liga clubs